György Horvath (21 December 1943 – 17 October 1988) was a Hungarian weightlifter who competed in the 1972 Summer Olympics.

References

1943 births
1988 deaths
Hungarian male weightlifters
Olympic weightlifters of Hungary
Weightlifters at the 1972 Summer Olympics
Olympic bronze medalists for Hungary
Olympic medalists in weightlifting
Medalists at the 1972 Summer Olympics
20th-century Hungarian people